This Is Your Time is Michael W. Smith's fourteenth studio album, released on November 23, 1999. All the songs from this album, except "This Is Your Time" and "This Is Your Time (Reprise)", were originally recorded for his previous studio album Live the Life, but did not make the final cut for the album.

Background 

The title track was inspired by the initial news report that Columbine shooting victim Cassie Bernall was killed for answering "yes" to the question "Do you believe in God?" Smith co-wrote the song with Wes King, having enlisted his help knowing that he wanted to write about Columbine but did not want to exploit a tragedy. The music video features a short video clip of Bernall talking about her religious beliefs and how she wanted to spread the word of God at the beginning.

Track listing

Personnel 

 Michael W. Smith – vocals, keyboards, programming, acoustic piano, Hammond B3 organ, acoustic guitar
 Bryan Lenox – keyboards, programming, drums, percussion 
 Mark Baldwin – guitars, acoustic guitar 
 Chris Graffagnino – guitars, acoustic guitar 
 Wes King – acoustic guitar 
 Chris Rodriguez – guitars, acoustic guitar, backing vocals (9)
 Matt Pierson – bass guitar 
 Craig Young – bass guitar 
 Raymond Boyd – drums, percussion 
 Eric Darken – drums, percussion 
 Scott Williamson – drums, percussion 
 Hunter Lee – Illyan pipes
 Greg Cutcliffe – bagpipes
 Jay Dawson – bagpipes 
 Mike Orrick – bagpipes
 Ronn Huff – string arrangements and conductor
 Carl Gorodetzsky – contractor
 The Nashville String Machine – strings
 David Davidson – string arrangements and contractor (5, 8, 10)
 The Love Sponge Strings – additional strings (5, 8, 10)
 John Elefante – backing vocals (2) 
 Nik Kershaw – backing vocals (2)
 Joanna Carlson – backing vocals (4)
 Chris Eaton – backing vocals (4, 11)
 Anna Smith – backing vocals (5)
 Whitney Smith – backing vocals (5)
 Lisa Bevill – backing vocals (7, 9)
 Bonnie Keen – backing vocals (9)
 Mark Pogue – backing vocals (9)

The "Franklin Boys Glee Club" on "Worth It All"
 Eric Elwell, Terry Flowers, Bryan Lenox, Fred Paragano and Michael W. Smith 

The "Choir" (5, 6 & 8)
 Angela Cruz, Natalie Grant, Darwin Hobbs, Gale Mayes-West, Tiffany Palmer, Leanne Palmore, Dwayne Starling and Terry White

Production

 Bryan Lenox – producer, engineer, mixing, string recording 
 Michael W. Smith – producer, executive producer
 Michael Blanton – executive producer 
 Eric Elwell – additional engineer, technical coordinator, production coordinator 
 Terry Flowers – additional engineer, assistant engineer, production assistant 
 Patrick Kelly – additional engineer
 Matt Weeks – additional engineer, string recording assistant 
 Rob Burrell – assistant engineer 
 Ron Jagger – assistant engineer 
 Scott Lenox – assistant engineer 
 Chad Brown – string recording assistant 
 Melissa Mattey – string recording assistant 
 Fred Paragano – Pro Tools engineer
 Hank Williams – sequencing, editing, mastering 
 Mary Adcock – production assistant 
 Alicia Claxton – production assistant 
 Morgan Daneker – production assistant 
 Surupa Mafia – production assistant 
 Whitney Smith – production assistant 
 Ben Pearson – photography 
 Diana Lussenden – layout 

Studios
 Recorded at Deer Valley Studios and The Sound Kitchen, Franklin, Tennessee
 Strings recorded at Ocean Way Nashville, Nashville, Tennessee and The Sound Kitchen
 Sequenced, edited and mastered at MasterMix, Franklin, Tennessee

Chart performance

References

Michael W. Smith albums
1999 albums
Songs based on actual events
Works about the Columbine High School massacre
Reunion Records albums